Pavlodar Region is a region of Kazakhstan. Its capital is the city of Pavlodar, which had a population of 360,014 at the start of 2018. Many people, especially Ukrainians, migrated to Pavlodar in Nikita Khrushchev's Virgin Lands Campaign. 

The Bayanaul National Park, a protected area of the Kazakh Uplands, is located in the Bayanaul Range, within 100 km of Ekibastuz.

Geography
Pavlodar borders Russia (Altai Krai, Omsk Oblast and Novosibirsk Oblast) to the north, and also borders the following Kazakh regions: Akmola (to the west), East Kazakhstan (to the south-east), North Kazakhstan (to the north-west), and Karaganda (to the south).

The Irtysh River flows from the Altay Mountains in China to Russia through the region; the Irtysh–Karaganda Canal crosses the western part, taking some of the river's water to Ekibastuz and Karaganda. The Sileti river also flows through the region.
There are many lakes in the region, most of them saline, such as Seletyteniz, Kyzylkak, Sladkoye, Koryakovka, Zhasybai, Zhalauly, Shureksor, Kudaikol, Karasor, Zhamantuz, Kalkaman, Maraldy, Moyildy and Bolshoy Azhbulat, among others.

Administrative divisions
The region is administratively divided into ten districts (aydany) and three cities of regional importance - Pavlodar, Aksu, and Ekibastuz. The districts and cities with their populations are:

* Three localities in Pavlodar Region have city status. These are Pavlodar, Aksu, and Ekibastuz.

Demographics

As of 2020, the Pavlodar Region has a population of 752,169.

Ethnic groups (2020):
Kazakh: 53.07%
Russian: 34.91%
Ukrainian: 4.18%
German: 2.66%
Tatar: 1.84%
Others: 3.34%

External links
Official regional website

References

 
Regions of Kazakhstan